Óscar Fernández Giralda (born October 23, 1974) is a retired male long-distance runner from Spain. He set his personal best (2:09:59) in the marathon on December 12, 2003 in Fukuoka, Japan.

He is currently a coach of a group of athletes belonging to the Isaac Viciosa athletics school. He also runs his own school of athletics in Tudela de Duero (Valladolid), called Santinos.

Achievements

References
 

1974 births
Living people
Spanish male long-distance runners
Spanish male marathon runners
20th-century Spanish people
21st-century Spanish people